Paso del Cerro is a village or populated centre in the Tacuarembó Department of northern-central Uruguay.

Geography
The railroad track Montevideo - Tacuarembó - Rivera passes through the village.

Population
In 2011 Paso del Cerro had a population of 235.
 
Source: Instituto Nacional de Estadística de Uruguay

References

External links
INE map of Paso del Cerro

Populated places in the Tacuarembó Department